Vermillion Township is a township in Dakota County, Minnesota, United States. The population was 1,243 at the 2000 census.

Vermillion Township was organized in 1858, and took its name from the Vermillion River.

Geography
According to the United States Census Bureau, the township has a total area of 34.1 square miles (88.4 km), all  land.

The city of Vermillion is geographically within Vermillion Township but is a separate entity.  The city of Coates is at the northwest corner of Vermillion Township.

Demographics

As of the census of 2000, there were 1,243 people, 395 households, and 325 families residing in the township. There were 403 housing units at an average density of 11.8/sq mi (4.6/km). The racial makeup of the township was 97.51% White, 0.16% African American, 0.32% Native American, 0.16% Asian, 0.08% Pacific Islander, 1.13% from other races, and 0.64% from two or more races. Hispanic or Latino of any race were 1.05% of the population.

There were 395 households, out of which 45.6% had children under the age of 18 living with them, 71.4% were married couples living together, 5.1% had a female householder with no husband present, and 17.7% were non-families. 12.7% of all households were made up of individuals, and 3.3% had someone living alone who was 65 years of age or older.  The average household size was 3.15 and the average family size was 3.46.

In the township the population was spread out, with 31.8% under the age of 18, 9.6% from 18 to 24, 29.5% from 25 to 44, 22.8% from 45 to 64, and 6.3% who were 65 years of age or older.  The median age was 36 years. For every 100 females, there were 111.0 males.  For every 100 females age 18 and over, there were 114.7 males.

The median income for a household in the township was $64,118, and the median income for a family was $69,688. Males had a median income of $46,184 versus $29,750 for females. The per capita income for the township was $24,783.  About 2.7% of families and 3.1% of the population were below the poverty line, including 4.0% of those under age 18 and 2.3% of those age 65 or over.

References

Townships in Dakota County, Minnesota
Townships in Minnesota